Hubert Porkert (born 25 September 1939) is an Austrian sailor. He competed in the Tornado event at the 1980 Summer Olympics.

References

External links
 

1939 births
Living people
Austrian male sailors (sport)
Olympic sailors of Austria
Sailors at the 1980 Summer Olympics – Tornado
Place of birth missing (living people)